{{Infobox film
| name           = The Last Days of Pompeii
| image          = Derniers_jours_de_Pompei_1950.jpg
| image_size     = 
| alt            = 
| caption        = 
| director       = Marcel L'HerbierPaolo Moffa
| producer       = Salvo D'Angelo
| based_on       = {{based on|'The Last Days of Pompeii 1834 novel|Edward Bulwer-Lytton}}
| screenplay     = 
| starring       = 
| music          = Roman VladG.R. Aldo
| cinematography = Roger Hubert
| editing        = Gisa Radicchi Levi
| studio         = 
| distributor    = 
| released       = 
| runtime        = 98 minutes
| country        = Italy / France
| language       = French / Italian
| budget         = 
| gross          = 
}}The Last Days of Pompeii (1950) is a black and white French-Italian historical drama, directed by Marcel L'Herbier "in collaboration with" Paolo Moffa, who was also the director of production. It was adapted from Edward Bulwer-Lytton's novel The Last Days of Pompeii. The film has also been known as Sins of Pompeii.

Plot
In Pompeii, in the year 79AD, Lysias, a wealthy young Greek, abducts the beautiful Hélène, who is a pupil of Arbax, the sinister High Priest of Isis.  For revenge, Arbax causes Lysias to drink a magic potion to make him fall in love with his ally Julie, but Lysias becomes mad from the drink.  Nidia, a young slave girl rescued by Lysias, has overheard the plot and accuses Arbax of trying to kill her master. Arbax kills the girl and has Lysias accused of the murder.  Condemned to the lions in the arena, Lysias only escapes the punishment when the eruption of Vesuvius brings panic to the town, and he leads Hélène to safety.

 Cast 
 Micheline Presle as Elena / Hélène 
 Georges Marchal as Lysia / Lysias 
 Marcel Herrand as Arbace / Arbax 
 Jaque Catelain as Clodio / Claudius 
 Adriana Benetti as Nidia 
 Laure Alex as Julie
 Camillo Pilotto as Diomede / Diomède
 Antonio Pierfederici as Olinto / Olinte 
 Guglielmo Barnabò as Panza
 Alain Quercy as Lepido / Lépide

Production
Principal filming took place in the summer of 1948 at the Cinecittà studios in Rome. The amphitheatre scenes were filmed at the Arena di Verona.  The production was then interrupted however for nearly a year, and was completed at the GTC studios at Joinville/Saint-Maurice in 1949.  The film was released in France and Italy in 1950.

The film considerably simplified the plot of Lytton's novel, and there was some alteration of the names of the principal characters: Glaucus became Lysias, and Ione became Hélène; Nidia was made the victim of Arbax rather than an agent of his defeat.

There were set designs and costumes by Aldo Tommasini and Veniero Colasanti, and special effects by B. de Kerblay. Lucio Fulci was 2nd unit director on the film.

Marcel L'Herbier approached the project as one of the "chroniques filmées" ("filmed histories") which his film work had favoured during the previous decade, giving some emphasis to the documentary aspects of the everyday life that had been preserved at Pompeii.  He initially approached Albert Camus to write the dialogue (having in mind the latter's play Caligula''), but in the event the task was undertaken by Alexandre Arnoux. L'Herbier admitted some reservation about the resulting film in spite of its strong cast and opulent settings.

References

External links
 
 
 Les Derniers Jours de Pompéi (1950) at Films de France

1950 films
1950 drama films
French disaster films
French epic films
French historical drama films
Films based on The Last Days of Pompeii
Films directed by Marcel L'Herbier
Films directed by Paolo Moffa
Films set in the Roman Empire
Films set in 79 AD
Pompeii in popular culture
Films about volcanoes
French multilingual films
Italian multilingual films
1950s historical drama films
French black-and-white films
1950s French films